Fabian Bredlow (born 2 March 1995) is a German professional footballer who plays as a goalkeeper for Bundesliga club VfB Stuttgart.

Club career

Youth
As a youth, he played for Hertha Zehlendorf and RB Leipzig.

FC Liefering
On 10 June 2014, he was loaned out to FC Red Bull Salzburg before sent to their reserve team FC Liefering.

VfB Stuttgart
In the summer of 2019, Bredlow moved to VfB Stuttgart.

References

External links

 

1995 births
Living people
Footballers from Berlin
German footballers
Germany youth international footballers
Association football goalkeepers
RB Leipzig players
FC Liefering players
Hallescher FC players
1. FC Nürnberg players
1. FC Nürnberg II players
VfB Stuttgart players
2. Bundesliga players
3. Liga players
Regionalliga players
2. Liga (Austria) players
Bundesliga players